St. Joseph Notre Dame High School (SJND) is an Independent High School in Alameda, California, United States.

History
On March 27, 1881, at the invitation of Father William Gleeson, pastor of St. Anthony Church in Brooklyn, (East Oakland), Sister Marie de Sacre Coeur and the Sisters of Notre Dame de Namur founded an academy for girls, grades one through twelve, on a plot of land on the corner of Chestnut Street and San Jose Avenue in Alameda. Notre Dame Academy educated the young women of Alameda in grades one through twelve.

St. Joseph's was, at that time a "mission" church of St. Anthony's. In 1885, Saint Joseph's Parish was established, with Father Michael McNaboe as first pastor.  In 1887 Fr. McNaboe requested the Sisters of Notre Dame de Namur to staff a boys elementary school.

In 1916 Father James Bernard Praught opened Saint Joseph Elementary School for the boys and girls of the parish. In 1922 a new co-ed grammar school was donated to the parish by Theresa Ettinger in memory of her husband, the late Victor Ettinger. When St. Joseph Elementary Grammar School was built, the original school buildings became part of the girls high school, the Academy was renamed Notre Dame High School, a combined boarding and day school. In 1960, Monsignor Alvin P. Wagner demolished the antiquated girls high school and built a new Saint Joseph's Notre Dame High School for girls. He erected the Gymnasium/Auditorium in 1964.  The Sisters of Notre Dame de Namur stayed with the elementary and high schools until 1990.

Saint Joseph's Boys High School was founded in 1935 by Father Praught and Father Joseph Tetzlaff, provincial of the Brothers of Mary (Marianists) on the same city block as Saint Joseph's Church, Saint Joseph's Elementary School and Notre Dame Girls High School. The Brothers of Mary (Marianists) departed in 1970.

In 1972, Pope Paul VI honored Monsignor Wagner and the people of the parish by making the church a minor basilica, renamed Saint Joseph Basilica.

In 1983, Msgr. Wagner retired. Oakland Bishop John Stephen Cummins plans were set in motion to no longer staff the parish with diocesan priests. Cummins invited the Fathers of the Congregation of the Sacred Heart. The new pastor, Father Patrick A. Goodwin, SSCC decided to consolidate the two schools.  These plans were completed in 1985 with the consolidation of the two single-sex schools into the coeducational St. Joseph Notre Dame High School. In 2007, the Congregation of the Sacred Hearts of Jesus and Mary decided to leave Saint Joseph's Community. Oakland Bishop Allen Vigneron returned the parish to the diocesan priests. Pastor (2008–2013) Father Fred Riccio. Archbishop Alexander Joseph Brunett, apostolic administrator of the Diocese of Oakland named Rev. George Alengadan, pastor of St. Joseph Basilica, Alameda, June 1, 2013.

Students
SJND enrolls approximately 470 students in grades 9 through 12. SJND students come from over 27 public, independent and Catholic schools. Approximately 50 percent of the students live in Alameda, 25 percent live in Oakland, and 25 percent live in neighboring East Bay communities. Student demographics reflect the Bay Area's cultural and ethnic diversity: African-American 13%, Asian 11%, Euro-American 29%, Filipino 12%, Latino 16%, Native American 1%, Multiracial/Other 17.7%.

Curriculum
St. Joseph Notre Dame has a college preparatory curriculum. The school offers honors level courses in English, Math, Science, and Foreign Language and offers Advanced Placement courses in U.S. History, World History, English Literature & Composition, English Language, American Government & Politics, Calculus AB, Calculus BC, Statistics, Physics, Computer Science, Chemistry, Biology, Spanish Language, Environmental Science, and Art Studio.

The school offers project-based learning and innovative courses including Coding, Mandarin, and a Biomedical Sciences program with STEM curricula. Ninety-nine percent of the senior class of 2014 enrolled in college, and graduates were offered just under $6 million in scholarships and awards. 2014 graduates will attend colleges universities including Brown University, California Polytechnic State University San Luis Obispo, Cornell University, Dominican University of California, New York University, Saint Mary's College of California, University of California schools, University of San Francisco, and others.

Arts
SJND boasts a comprehensive arts program that includes visual, performing and literary arts offered in more than a dozen courses as well as a host of related student clubs.  SJND student artists have been honored for their work in several areas. Each year since 2007, student photographers, illustrators, painters, digital and mixed media artists have garnered honors in competitions including First Place and Best in Show honors in the Congressional Art Competition and other competitions and exhibitions.

The 2014 SJND musical In the Heights was among the top six high school musicals in California in the California State Musical Theater Honors competition.

For more than three decades the school's arts magazine Prisms has showcased student visual and literary works as well as original musical scores, earning first place awards and other honors from The American Scholastic Press Association and National Council of Teachers of English.

Athletics
St. Joseph Notre Dame offers interscholastic sports teams in baseball, basketball, cheerleading, crew, cross country, golf, lacrosse, soccer, softball, swimming, tennis, track and field, and volleyball. The school does not field a football team.

Despite being a small school, SJND has a reputation as a basketball state and national powerhouse, having won six California Interscholastic Federation (CIF) State Championships, a modern-era record for a Northern California school. Most notably, SJND won two Boys' Division I state titles, despite having a student body less than half the size of virtually all CIF Division I schools, defeating Fremont High School of Los Angeles in 1991 and Mater Dei High School of Santa Ana in 1992.  SJND reached the Boys' CIF Division I Finals two more times in 1997 & 1998, losing to Crenshaw High School and Westchester High School, respectively.  In 2004, SJND won the Boys' Division IV Championship against Verbum Dei High School of Los Angeles, 49–47. Most recently, SJND won the 2011 Boys' Division V State Championship against St. Bernard High School of Playa Del Rey, in 2014 against Renaissance Academy, and once again against St. Bernard in 2016. SJND also appeared in the 2009 Boys' Division V Finals, losing to Windward High School of Los Angeles, 69–53.

SJND boasts five former All-Americans, three of which were named to the prestigious McDonald's All-American game. These include Cal, Bay Area, and NBA Hall-of-Fame inductee, two-time California High School Player of the Year, and the recipient of the Naismith Award and the National High School Player of the Year by USA Today, Jason Kidd ('92); Villanova alum Calvin Byrd ('89); and UCLA alum and Slam Magazine's High School Diary featured columnist, Ray Young ('98). Adrian Ealy ('92) and Stanford graduate, Justin Davis ('99) were also recipients of All-American honors. The school has a long list of players who went on to compete at the collegiate level. Among this list are the alums who went on to compete at the Division I level. This includes: Cameron Ba ('18-UCD); Kevin Butler ('00-UCR); Hondre Brewer ('98-USF); Blandon Ferguson ('99-Illinois); Jon Gordon ('96-SMC); Alex Harris ('04-UCSB); Allen Hester ('05-Ohio); Renee Jacques ('98-CSUS); Brandon Keane ('11-N.CO); Adrian McCullough ('96-UNR); Nate Murase ('98-CSUS); Miles Tarver (UoM); David Victor ('93-UNR/CSUS); Ari Warmerdam ('02-UCD); Temidayo Yussuf ('14-LBSU). Pilots Rashawn Fulcher ('96) and Benjamin Ortner ('01) were also Division II National Champions for Metropolitan State of Denver.

The basketball program has also included two of the winningest and most revered California coaches of all-time in the late Frank LaPorte (735 wins) and current head coach Don Lippi (908 wins). Frank LaPorte is one of just two Northern California coaches to be named head coach of the McDonald's All-American game ('92), while Don Lippi has been the recipient of multiple regional and statewide honors. Lippi is also the all-time winningest high school coach in Northern California and currently ranks 4th in California state history. 

In men's tennis, St. Joseph Notre Dame won three BSAL Singles Championships in 2006, 2007, and 2008. The men's volleyball team enjoyed similar success as they captured three successive BSAL titles from 2006 to 2008.

Recently, SJND's cross-country team has enjoyed great success as well. They were the state champions in their division in 2012 and 2013. In the 2011 season, the team won the BSAL breaking St. Mary's decade-long winning streak. They also won NCS Division V with a record-setting time by Gabe Arias-Sheridan. The team placed 3rd in the State meet with a 3rd-place finish by Nick Ratto. Later that year, Ratto fished 3rd statewide in the 800m race. Cooper Teare won the Division V State Championship cross country races in 2015 and 2016 with times of 15:07 and 14:58 respectively. Teare continued his success winning the California All-State 3200 in 2016 and the Indoor National Titles for the 5k and 1-Mile in 2017. On April 14, 2017, Cooper ran a 4:00.16 Mile. At the time, this was the 10th fastest mile by an American high schooler ever.

St. Joseph Notre Dame's mascot is the Pilot, in honor of the city's former Naval Air Station.

Notable alumni

 Dennis Breedlove, botanist and herbarium curator
 Mark Curry, comedian/actor, star of the popular 1990s television show Hangin' with Mr. Cooper
 Jason Kidd, former professional basketball player and head coach of the Dallas Mavericks. Won two championships: one as a player with the Mavericks in 2011 and one as an assistant for the Los Angeles Lakers in 2020
 Joe Nelson, Florida Marlins pitcher
 Don Perata, teacher and politician
 Barry Reed, novelist, author of The Verdict later a movie starring Paul Newman
 Gail Rodrigues, Dedicated educator and role model. Still an active part of the school's community
 Harmit Mann, President and CEO CREShomes.
 Cooper Teare, competitive distance runner
 Damian Lillard, NBA point guard for the Portland Trail Blazers
 Alex Harris, 3rd all-time leading scorer at UCSB

References

External links
McClish, Carrie. "Alums recall their days at Notre Dame and St. Joseph", The Catholic Voice, March 6, 2006

Roman Catholic Diocese of Oakland
Catholic secondary schools in California
Buildings and structures in Alameda, California
Educational institutions established in 1881
High schools in Alameda County, California
1881 establishments in California